This paleobotany list records new fossil plant taxa that were to be described during the year 2022, as well as notes other significant paleobotany discoveries and events which occurred during 2022.

Algae

Charophytes

Charophyte research
 A study on the Paleocene charophyte flora from the South Gobi area in the Junggar Basin (China) and on the Paleogene fossil record of charophytes is published by Cao et al. (2022), who interpret their findings as evidence of the dispersal of charophyte lineages from Asia to Europe in the middle to late Eocene, possibly facilitated by waterbirds.

Chlorophytes

Lycopodiopsida

Lycopsid research
 Description of new fossil material of Guangdedendron micrum, providing new information on the morphology of this plant, is published by Gao et al. (2022).
 Xu, Liu & Wang (2022) describe new fossil material of Sublepidodendron grabaui from the Devonian (Famennian) Wutong Formation (China), providing new information on the morphology of the female reproductive organs of this plant.

Marchantiophyta

Marchantiophyta research
 New specimens of Radula heinrichsii, providing new information on the morphology of this liverwort, are described from the Cretaceous Burmese amber by Wang et al. (2022).

Ferns and fern allies

Fern and fern ally research 
 Pecopteris lativenosa is interpreted as a member of the late Paleozoic marattialean family Psaroniaceae by Li et al. (2022).

Gnetales

Bennettitales

Ginkgophytes

Ginkgophyte research
 Revision of Ginkgo abaniensis, based on data from leaves from the Jurassic Mura Formation (Russia), is published by Frolov & Mashchuk (2022), who emend the diagnosis of this species, and transfer Ginkgo abaniensis, Ginkgo glinkiensis and Ginkgo capillata to the genus Ginkgoites.

Conifers

Araucariaceae

Cheirolepidiaceae

Cupressaceae

Pinaceae

Podocarpaceae

Sciadopityaceae

Other conifers

Conifer research
 Bodnar et al. (2022) reassess the anatomy and systematics of the permineralized conifer-like woods from the Triassic strata from Argentina, confirm the assignment of the logs related to the families Cupressaceae and Cheirolepidiaceae, as well as three taxa related to Araucariaceae (Agathoxylon cozzoi, Agathoxylon protoaraucana and Agathoxylon argentinum), and argue that the fossil woods previously assigned to the families Podocarpaceae and Taxaceae do not have enough preserved characters to support such assignment.
 A study on the pattern of conifer turnover across the Cretaceous-Paleogene boundary in the Raton and Denver basins (Colorado, United States) is published by Berry (2022).
 Mantzouka, Akkemik & Güngör (2022) describe fossil woods of Cupressinoxylon matromnense from the middle Miocene Eşelek volcanic deposits (Gökçeada, Turkey), preserved with feeding damage produced by members of the agromyzid genus Protophytobia, and supporting the existence of an eastern Mediterranean Miocene Climatic Optimum hotspot which additionally included Greek islands of Lemnos and Lesbos.

Flowering plants

Chloranthales

Magnoliids

Laurales

Magnoliales

Piperales

Monocots

Lilioid monocots

Commelinid monocots

Monocot research
 Leaf fossils of costapalmate-palms belonging to the genus Sabalites are described from the ?Santonian–Campanian Belly River Group, Campanian Foremost Formation (Alberta, Canada) and Maastrichtian Frenchman Formation (Saskatchewan, Canada) by Greenwood, Conran & West (2022), who interpret the studied fossils as constraining climate reconstructions for the Late Cretaceous high mid-latitudes of North America (c. 55° N) to exclude significant freezing episodes; the authors also transfer the Late Cretaceous species "Geonomites" imperialis to the genus Phoenicites, and reassess Sabalites carolinensis as more likely to be Campanian than Coniacian–Santonian in age.
 A study on the impact of the absence of megaherbivores in the aftermath of the Cretaceous–Paleogene extinction event on the evolution of palms is published by Onstein, Kissling & Linder (2022).
 A study on the evolutionary history of palms belonging to the group Mauritiinae, as inferred from a phylogenetic analysis incorporating fossil data, is published by Bacon et al. (2022).

Basal eudicots

Proteales

Protealean research
Redescription of the Okanagan Highlands  genus Langeria with description of associated stipules and reproductive structures plus formal reassignment of the genus to Platanaceae by Huegele & Manchester is published.

Ranunculales

Superasterids

Aquifoliales

Caryophyllales

Cornales

Dipsacales

Ericales

Icacinales

Metteniusales

Superrosids

Cucurbitales

Fabales

Fabalean research
 New fossil material of members of the genus Bauhinia is described from the Eocene of the Puyang Basin (China) by Jia et al. (2022), who interpret their findings as the earliest reliable fossil records of Bauhinia in Asia.
 Moya et al. (2022) study the affinities of fossil legumes Entrerrioxylon victoriensis, Gossweilerodendroxylon palmariensis, Paraoxystigma concordiensis and Cylicodiscuxylon paragabunensis from the Cenozoic Paraná, Arroyo Feliciano and El Palmar formations (Argentina) with extant West African legumes, and discuss the possible migration routes by which these plants may have arrived in South America from Africa.

Fagales

Malpighiales

Malvales

Malvalean research
 A study on the evolutionary history of Dipterocarpaceae, as indicated by biogeography of pollen fossils from Africa and India, molecular data and fossil amber records, is published by Bansal et al. (2022).

Myrtales

Oxalidales

Oxalidalean research
Tand, Smith, and Atkinson describe the first North American instance of the previously Paleo-Antarctic Rainforest Lineage Cunoniaceae fruits from Sucia Island.  Previously considered solely a Gondwanan family, the new species indicate a complex geographic history for the group.

Rosales

Sapindales

Other angiosperms

General angiosperm research
 Surangea mohgaoensis, originally interpreted as fern megaspores, is reinterpreted as angiosperm fruits by Ramteke et al. (2022).
 Zhang et al. (2022) describe rich assemblages of spiny plant fossils from the Eocene (Bartonian) Niubao Formation (Tibet, China), preserving seven different spine morphologies, and interpret this finding as evidence of the presence of a diversity of spiny plants in Eocene central Tibet, as well as evidence of a rapid diversification of spiny plants in Eurasia around that time.
A preliminary report on a new fossil angiosperm flora of the Lesvos Petrified Forest at Akrocheiras east of Sigri on Lesbos, Greece is given by Kafetzidou et al. Preliminary taxa identifications are given and commentary on the climactic implications are made.
 A study aiming to determine the relationship between past atmospheric CO2 and temperature fluctuations and the shifts in diversification rates of Poaceae and Asteraceae is published by Palazzesi et al. (2022).

Other plants

Other plant research
 A study on the xylem development in Leptocentroxyla, and on its implications for the knowledge of the evolution of pith, is published by Tomescu & McQueen (2022).
 Decombeix et al. (2022) report evidence of tylosis formation in permineralized wood of Dameria hueberi from the Tournaisian of Australia.
 The first comprehensive crown reconstruction of Medullosa stellata var. typica, based on data from a specimen from the Chemnitz petrified forest (Germany), is presented by Luthardt et al. (2022).
 Fossil material of Rhabdotaenia is reported from the Permian Umm Irna Formation (Jordan) by Blomenkemper et al. (2022), representing the northernmost occurrence of this Gondwanan leaf type reported to date.

Palynology

Research
 Review of the studies on the origin of the land flora is published by Bowman (2022).
 A study on the evolution of body plans of members of Viridiplantae, based on a review of the fossil record, molecular data and developmental biology, is published by Niklas & Tiffney (2022).
 A study on the biodiversity of land plants at the equator during their first major diversification in the Late Silurian–Early Devonian is published by Wellman et al. (2022).
 A study on the evolution of heterospory during the Devonian is published by Leslie & Bonacorsi (2022).
 Seven coniferous nurse logs that have been colonized by conifer and equisetalean roots are reported from four Permian intervals in the Ordos Basin (China) by Feng et al. (2022), indicating that conifer tree stems probably functioned as hosts to both conspecific and interspecific seedlings in the Cathaysian Flora.
 A study on the impact of the Intertropical Convergence Zone in the emerging South Atlantic region on Aptian plant communities from eight Brazilian sedimentary basins is published by Carvalho et al. (2022), who report evidence of an overall predominance of xerophytic plants, attesting to more dry conditions, and of a humidification trend towards the end of the late Aptian resulting in the predominance of hydrophytes, hygrophytes, tropical lowland flora and upland flora, indicative of prevalence of lowland and montane rainforests.
 A study on the distribution and relative abundances of major plant groups from the Albian Gates Formation (Alberta, Canada) is published by Kalyniuk et al. (2022).
 A study on the relationship between whole-genome duplication, seed traits and the selectivity of the survival of plants during the Cretaceous–Paleogene extinction event is published by Berry & Jaganathan (2022).
 New Oligocene flora is described from the Dong Ho Formation (Vietnam) by Huang et al. (2022), who interpret the studied fossils as evidence of long-term environmental, floristic and vegetational stability in this region since the Paleogene.
 Gentis et al. (2022) describe fossil wood specimens from the Miocene Natma Formation (Myanmar), representing an assemblage dominated by members of the families Fabaceae and Dipterocarpaceae, interpreted as coming from different types of low altitude forest ecosystems (tropical wet evergreen, tropical dry and deciduous, and tropical littoral), and interpreted as indicative of a monsoonal climate with an alternance of a dry season and a wet season.
 Abundant compression floras dominated by angiosperm leaves are described from two sites of probable Pliocene age in Brunei by Wilf et al. (2022), who interpret these floras as evidence of dipterocarp-dominated lowland rainforests in the Malay Archipelago before the Pleistocene.
 A study on the impact of the extinct Neotropical megafauna on the variability in plant functional traits and biome geography in Central and South America is published by Dantas & Pausas (2022).
 A study on plant material from rock overhangs from mid-late Holocene sites along the Kawarau-Cromwell-Roxburgh Gorges in Central Otago (New Zealand), much of which was likely transported as roosting material or consumed by moa birds, and on its implications for the knowledge of the mid-late Holocene regional vegetation of Central Otago and the knowledge of vegetation changes since mid-late Holocene, is published by Pole (2022).
 A study on the role of hydraulic failure in the evolution of early vascular plants is published by Bouda et al. (2022), suggesting that drought selection played a key role in the diversification of vascular arrangements beginning with the Devonian explosion.

References 

2022 in paleontology
Paleobotany